Lena Teresia Hansson (born 18 May 1955) is a Swedish actress. She was born in Stockholm and began acting at Vår teater, a children's theatre. She studied at Swedish National Academy of Mime and Acting in Stockholm. Hansson is in a relationship with fellow Swedish actor Peter Haber. At the 24th Guldbagge Awards she won the award for Best Actress for her role in Lethal Film.

Selected filmography
2003 – Paradiset
1998 – Beck – Öga för öga
1994 – Sommarmord
1993 – Murder at the Savoy
1993 – Ni bad om det
1992 – Jönssonligan och den svarta diamanten
1991 – The Best Intentions
1990 – Saxofonhallicken
1990 – Ebba och Didrik
1989 – Codename Coq Rouge
1989 – Tre kärlekar
1989 – Flickan vid stenbänken
1988 – Go'natt Herr Luffare
1987 – Jim och piraterna Blom
1986 – The Mozart Brothers
1986 – Amorosa
1984 – Som ni vill ha det
1975 – A Guy and a Gal
1974 – En enkel melodi

References

External links

1955 births
Swedish film actresses
Living people
Actresses from Stockholm
Best Actress Guldbagge Award winners
20th-century Swedish actresses